Ajax is a provincial electoral district in Ontario, Canada. It elects one member to the Legislative Assembly of Ontario. This riding was created in 2015.

Members of Provincial Parliament

Election results

References

External links 
Riding map from Elections Ontario

Ontario provincial electoral districts
Ajax, Ontario